John "Tarcat" Terry was a Negro league second baseman in the 1930s.

Terry made his Negro leagues debut in 1931 with the Indianapolis ABCs. He went on to play for the Homestead Grays in 1932 and 1933, then spent a season with the Cincinnati Tigers in 1934 before returning to the Grays to finish his career in 1936.

References

External links
 and Seamheads

Place of birth missing
Place of death missing
Year of birth missing
Year of death missing
Cincinnati Tigers (baseball) players
Homestead Grays players
Indianapolis ABCs (1931–1933) players